The 8th Bangladesh National Film Awards were presented by the Ministry of Information, Bangladesh to felicitate the best of Bangladeshi cinema released in the year 1983. The ceremony took place in Dhaka in 1983 and awards were given by the then president of Bangladesh. Every year, a national panel appointed by the government selects the winning entry, and the award ceremony is held in Dhaka.

List of winners
For 1983, awards were given in 10 categories. Awards for Best Child Artist, Best Music Director, Best Male Playback Singer, Best Female Playback Singer, Best Art Director, Best Editing were not given in 1983.

Merit awards

Technical awards

See also
 Meril Prothom Alo Awards
 Ifad Film Club Award
 Babisas Award

References

External links

National Film Awards (Bangladesh) ceremonies
1983 film awards
1985 awards in Bangladesh
1985 in Dhaka
January 1985 events in Bangladesh